Kav ha-Yashar (lit. The Just Measure; קב הישר),
authored by Rabbi Tzvi Hirsch Kaidanover (1648–1712; Rabbi at Frankfurt, son of Aaron Samuel Kaidanover),
is an "ethical-kabbalistic collection of stories, moral guidance, and customs",
and one of the most popular works of musar literature of the last 300 years. 
It serves as a guide to "God-fearing piety and to preserving the norms of the community", framing its teachings in the context of "individual providence and the reckoning of sins and merits".
The title of the work alludes to the number of chapters it contains (קב = 102), as well as the author's name (הישר = הירש).

Kav ha-Yashar is famous for uplifting the spirits of Jewish communities in Europe after the Chmelnitzki Massacres of 1648-1649. 
First published in 1705 in Frankfurt am Main, it has appeared in over 80 editions, in nearly every country in the world with a Jewish community. 
Kaidanover also prepared a Yiddish version, which went through at least 10 editions.

The work draws on "Yesod Yosef", a mussar work infused with the Kabbalistic teachings of the Ari written by Kaidanover's teacher Yosef Yoske of Dubno; 

and Kav ha-Yashar then constitutes "a deliberate effort to popularize Safedian Kabbalah by adopting a much more understandable style in Hebrew."
Relatedly, it reflects, to some extent, a Kabbalistic dualism, dividing all aspects of reality "according to their affinity" either with the divine or with impurity.

External links
Kav HaYashar (at Sefaria)

References

Jewish philosophical and ethical texts
Hebrew-language religious books
Sifrei Kodesh